Conner's Bookstore, also known as Dallas Music, was a historic commercial building located in downtown Evansville, Indiana. It was built in 1865, and was a vernacular building. It has been demolished.

It was listed on the National Register of Historic Places in 1984.

References

Commercial buildings on the National Register of Historic Places in Indiana
Commercial buildings completed in 1865
Buildings and structures in Evansville, Indiana
National Register of Historic Places in Evansville, Indiana